The Arabian Nightmare is a novel by Robert Irwin published in 1983. The Arabian Nightmare was inspired by The Arabian Nights, as well as the novel The Manuscript Found in Saragossa by Jan Potocki.

Plot summary
The Arabian Nightmare is a novel in which the setting is Cairo in 1486, under the rule of the Mamluk Sultanate. The protagonist is Balian of Norwich, an Englishman going to a pilgrimage to the view the relics of Saint Catherine in the Sinai Desert, while also working as a spy for the French court. After Balian arrives in Cairo, he falls asleep and begins to have a series of disturbing dreams.

Reception
Dave Langford reviewed The Arabian Nightmare for White Dwarf #69, and stated that "It is a dream without awakening (says the blurb), a flight without escape, a tale without end. I liked it a lot." John Clute, reviewing The Arabian Nightmare, stated "The Arabian Nightmare is a joy to read.  As a teacher of medieval history who has published in the field, Irwin clearly knows Mameluke Egypt very thoroughly indeed and has anchored his most fantastical flights with details that seem clearly authentic".

Reviews
Review by Brian Stableford (1984) in Fantasy Review, October 1984
Review by Maureen Porter (1987) in Vector 141
Review by Don D'Ammassa (1988) in Science Fiction Chronicle, #102 March 1988
Review by Robert K. J. Killheffer (1989) in The New York Review of Science Fiction, May 1989

References

1983 novels
English fantasy novels
Novels set in the 1480s